The 1946 NCAA basketball tournament involved 8 schools playing in single-elimination play to determine the national champion of men's NCAA Division I college basketball. It began on March 21, 1946, and ended with the championship game on March 26 in New York City. A total of 10 games were played, including a third-place game in each region and a national third-place game.

Oklahoma A&M, coached by Henry Iba, won the national title with a 43–40 victory in the final game over North Carolina, coached by Ben Carnevale. Bob Kurland of Oklahoma A&M was named the tournament's Most Outstanding Player. The Aggies were the first team to win a second NCAA championship, the first to repeat as champions, and the first of two teams (San Francisco being the other) to win the title in their first two NCAA appearances. 

This was the first tournament to have four teams advance to the final site, though not the first to have a true "Final Four" format (that would not occur until 1952). The two regional losers played in the national third-place game, while the two winners played for the championship.  The third-place game would continue through the 1981 tournament.

Locations
The following were the sites which hosted each round of the 1946 tournament:

Regionals

March 21 and 23
East Regional, Madison Square Garden, New York, New York
March 22 and 23
West Regional, Municipal Auditorium, Kansas City, Missouri

Championship Game

March 26
Madison Square Garden, New York, New York

Teams

Bracket
* – Denotes overtime period

See also
 1946 NAIA Division I men's basketball tournament
 1946 National Invitation Tournament

References

NCAA Division I men's basketball tournament
Tournament
NCAA basketball tournament
NCAA basketball tournament